William Keith Dunn (10 July 1906 – 29 May 1962) was an Australian rules footballer who played with Sturt in the SANFL and Carlton in the VFL.

A ruckman, Dunn made his debut for Sturt in 1927 and went on to play 74 games for the club. In 1933, his last SANFL season, he won both the Magarey Medal and his club's best and fairest award. The following season he moved to Victoria and spent four years with Carlton. Over the course of his career he represented the South Australian interstate side on three occasions.

References

External links

1906 births
Carlton Football Club players
Sturt Football Club players
Magarey Medal winners
Australian rules footballers from South Australia
1962 deaths
Australian Army personnel of World War II
Australian Army soldiers